Paul Franzenburg (November 18, 1916 – October 31, 2004) was an American politician and businessman.

Biography
Franzenburg was born in Conrad, Iowa and graduated from Pierson High School. He help organized the school band. Franzenburg served in the United States Army during World War II. He was involved with the family business: The Franzenburg Provision Company, a meat processing business. Franzenburg served on the Conrad Board of Education and was a Democrat. He served as Treasurer of Iowa from 1965 to 1969. In 1968, he ran for Governor of Iowa, being defeated by incumbent Governor Robert D. Ray. He serve on the Iowa Utilities Board  from 1983 until 1991. Franzenburg died at the Iowa Jewish Senior Life Center, in Des Moines, Iowa from heart failure and complications from hip replacement surgery.

Notes

External links

1916 births
2004 deaths
People from Grundy County, Iowa
Military personnel from Iowa
Businesspeople from Iowa
Iowa Democrats
School board members in Iowa
State treasurers of Iowa
20th-century American businesspeople